Lifewater International is a non-profit Christian water development organization serving the world's rural poor through integrated water, sanitation, and hygiene programs. In 40 years, Lifewater has served 2.5 million people in 40 countries.

Lifewater has U.S.-based offices in Bentonville, Arkansas and San Luis Obispo, California with field offices in Uganda, Ethiopia, Cambodia, and Tanzania.

History

Lifewater was founded by William A. Ashe in 1977. Owner of a water pump business, the Ashe family started taking trips to Mexico to promote water and sanitation to those in need in the 1960s. Over time, these small family trips grew to include other volunteer water professionals. 

Ashe officially established the Lifewater name in 1977. Ashe attended a Billy Graham conference in Amsterdam in 1983 and received over 2,000 requests for safe water from pastors and evangelists in over 100 countries.

In 1984 Lifewater became a registered California non-profit corporation and in 1986 was granted tax-exempt 501(c)(3) status by the IRS. Throughout the 1980s and 1990s, Lifewater used volunteers to serve thousands of communities around the world with safe water, adding improved sanitation and hygiene practices to its list of essential services as their necessity became more apparent. As Ashe transitioned the organization from volunteers to professional staff, Lifewater collaborated with ministries in-country to advance the cause of WASH (Water, Sanitation, Hygiene) and promote Christianity to those in need.

Service Areas and Populations 
Lifewater operates in Tanzania, Uganda, Cambodia, and Ethiopia. Lifewater begins with Least Developed Countries and staff conduct on-the-ground research to identify regions in those countries with the greatest need for WASH. By doing so, the organization serves rural communities in extremely poor regions who would greatly benefit from sustainable safe drinking water, improved health, and the hope of Jesus. 

In 2019, the organization served over 174,596 people and completed 207 water sources.

While much of Lifewater's work has focused on developing countries, it has also become involved in helping Ukrainians during the 2022 Russia-Ukraine War. To help Ukrainian refugees get the water they need to survive, Lifewater Canada partnered with a non-profit organization that trucks water and other necessities from Poland into Ukraine.

Water, Sanitation, and Hygiene
Lack of safe water and waterborne diseases result in the deaths of millions each year. Many of these death are children under 5. When safe water is not available close to home, school, or work, children are at risk and miss out on their education, adults miss out on work and productive labor, large portions of household income are spent on medical care, and the cycle of poverty continues. Even when safe water is available, people can spend hours every day retrieving it at great distances.

However, the best solution is not access to safe water alone. Research shows that combining safe water with sanitation and hygiene does much more to decrease the disease burden in a community.

Strategy
Lifewater uses a grassroots program model called "Vision of a Healthy Village" (VHV). VHV is a holistic approach to solving the global water and sanitation crisis drawn from industry-best practices and rooted in the belief that every person has skills to contribute to their own progress. Prioritizing relationships, house-by-house data collection, and locally-appropriate water technology, VHV helped communities live healthy lives.

Lifewater professional team of water technicians are trained to use shallow and deep drilling rigs to reach water under the surface. In some cases, spring caps, rain catchment systems, or cisterns are more appropriate. Local water committees are trained and to care for the water source, collect user fees to save for needed repairs, and carry out frequent maintenance.

To improve sanitation, Lifewater uses the Community-Led Total Sanitation program to show communities the importance of good sanitation, and help communities achieve open defecation free (ODF) status. Households must build their own ventilated improved pit (VIP) latrine, and larger latrine blocks are built at schools.

To improve hygiene, Lifewater teaches about the importance of handwashing with soap, keeping water safe, keeping households free of waste, and drying dishes in clean areas.

Finances
In FY 2018, Lifewater received $6,118,092 in donations. The organization reports that 83.1% of this revenue is from contributions, gifts, and grants and 16.9% are from fundraising events.

Lifewater reports that 75% of all donations go to programs, 12.4 to fundraising, and 12.2 to administrative costs. See more about Lifewater on Charity Navigator: https://www.charitynavigator.org/index.cfm?bay=search.summary&orgid=7493

References

 Beyond Scarcity: Power, poverty and the Global Water Crisis. 2006 Human Development Report  from the UN Development Program
 http://lifewater.org/crisis/
 https://web.archive.org/web/20140314162434/http://lifewater.org/mwash/
 http://lifewater.org/about/
 http://www.who.int/water_sanitation_health/publications/facts2004/en/

Charities based in California
Development charities based in the United States
Water-related charities